UAE Warriors is a mixed martial arts league and martial arts promotion in the Middle East based in Abu Dhabi, United Arab Emirates. Established in 2012, UAE Warriors has to date held 34 events across five nations.

See also
Ultimate Fighting Championship
Bellator MMA

References

2012 establishments in the United Arab Emirates
Mixed martial arts organizations
Mixed martial arts television shows
Mixed martial arts in Asia
Organisations based in Abu Dhabi
Sport in Abu Dhabi